Dermot McNicholl (born 6 November 1965) is an Irish former Gaelic footballer who played for the Derry county team in the 1980s and 1990s. He was part of Derry's 1993 All-Ireland Championship winning side, also winning Ulster Senior Football Championships in 1987 and 1993. An All Star winner, he usually played in the half-forward line and was regarded as one of the best footballers in Ireland at a time. 

McNicholl is from Glenullin, County Londonderry, Northern Ireland, and played club football with John Mitchel's GAC Glenullin, where he won a Derry Senior Football Championship in 1985. He was described by former Derry teammate Fergal McCusker as "impossible to mark". He managed home-club Glenullin in 2009.

Football career

School/college career
McNicholl attended school at St Patrick's College, Maghera. He played in five consecutive MacRory Cup finals (1980–1984), winning four of them. He was only in third year when playing on his first MacRory team. In 1980 and 1984 he was runner-up in the Hogan Cup to Carmelite College, Moate and St Jarlath's College, Tuam respectively. At university he won three Sigerson Cup and two Ryan Cup medals with UUJ. McNicholl was once asked by Adrian McGuckin what did he learn at school, McNicholl replied, "I learned how to kick a ball."

Club career
Despite being only 19 at the time, McNicholl captained Glenullin to their 1985 Derry Senior Football Championship success. Prior to this he had won two Derry Minor Football Championships with the club in 1981 and 1982. In 2007 he was awarded a Northern Bank Ulster Minor Club Football All Star, being recognised as one of the best players to ever have competed in the Ulster Minor Club Football Championship, in the competition's 25th year. He also won U-14 and U-16 Derry Championships with Glenullin.

McNicholl was in the United States for a short period the early 1990s and while there played with St Columbkille's GFC, Boston. He along with fellow Derry man Éamonn Burns helped the club win a Boston Senior Football Championship in 1991.

Inter-county career
McNicholl was known as one of Derry GAA's best ever underage players. He played Minor football for Derry for four years from 1980 (when he was 14) to 1983. He won three Ulster Minor Football Championships (1980, 1981 and 1983) and played in All-Ireland Minor Championship finals in those years, winning in 1983, where he was captain. He also won three Ulster Under-21 Football Championships in 1983, 1985 and 1986 and was runner-up in 1983 and 1985 in the All-Ireland Under-21 Championships.

McNicholl made his Senior debut against Louth in the National League in October, 1983, while still a Minor. He won an All Star for his performances in the 1984 Championship, while still at school and is the youngest ever recipient of an All Star.

He won an Ulster Senior Championship in 1987, but was badly affected by a hamstring injury during the All-Ireland semi-final defeat to Meath. He missed the 1989 and 1990 campaigns due to being in Australia playing professional Australian rules football. He was part of Derry's National League winning team in 1992. McNicholl added a second Ulster Senior Championship medal in 1993, before going on to win the 1993 All-Ireland Championship after a semi-final victory over Dublin and final defeat of Cork. Injury prevented him from starting these two games, but came on as a substitute in both. He won a further two National League medals in 1995 and 1996. He was plagued by injury in the latter years of his career, often preventing him from starting matches and was forced to retire soon after.

International and Australian rules career
Dermot McNicholl represented Ireland in three International Rules Series, firstly in 1984. He was so impressive during the 1987 series that Victoria Football Association (VFA) club Prahran enticed him to move to Melbourne in October 1989. Two weeks later, St Kilda drafted him with the 99th selection in the 1988 VFL draft, one of the first three Irish players to be drafted. He spent the 1989 season playing for Prahran, before injury forced him to miss the first half of the 1990 season, after which he recovered and made his senior debut for St Kilda. He played three senior games before returning to Ireland to complete his university studies.

In 2008 Australian Football League agent Ricky Nixon recruited McNicholl as one of four Irish scouts to look for talented young Gaelic football players for possible recruitment to AFL teams.

Management career
McNicholl teaches at St Patrick's College, Maghera, and has managed many of the school's teams at different age levels since 1994, helping them to four MacRory and three Hogan Cups successes. He was involved with Slaughtneil Minors for two years and during that time they won the Derry Minor Football Championship twice (1998 and 1999) and also won the 1998 Ulster Minor Club Championship (and finished runners up in 1999). 

At Senior level he has also been involved with Dungiven and Tyrone club Ardboe. After a three-year break from club management, McNicholl was confirmed as new Glenullin manager at the club's Annual General Meeting on 4 January 2009. He guided the club to victory over reigning champions Ballinderry in the quarter-finals of the 2009 Derry Senior Football Championship. They were however defeated by Dungiven in the semi-final stage. It was announced in December 2009 that he would not be seeking another term with the club.

Honours

County
All-Ireland Senior Football Championship - Winner (1): 1993
National Football League - Winner (3): 1992, 1995, 1996
Ulster Senior Football Championship - Winner (2): 1987, 1993
Ulster Senior Football Championship - Runner up: 1985, 1992
Dr McKenna Cup - Winner (1): 1993
All-Ireland Under-21 Football Championship - Runner up: 1983, 1985
Ulster Under-21 Football Championship - Winner (3): 1983, 1985, 1986
All-Ireland Minor Football Championship - Winner (1): 1983
All-Ireland Minor Football Championship - Runner up: 1980, 1981
Ulster Minor Football Championship - Winner (3): 1980, 1981, 1983

Club
Derry Senior Football Championship- Winner (1): 1985
Boston Senior Football Championship - Winner (1): 1991
Derry Minor Football Championship - Winner (2): 1981, 1982
Numerous underage awards including U-14 and U-16 Derry Championships

Province
Railway Cup - Winner (?): Years?

College
Sigerson Cup - Winner (3): 1986, 1987, 1991
Ryan Cup - Winner (2): Years?
Hogan Cup - Runner-up: 1980, 1984
MacRory Cup - Winner (4): 1980, 1982, 1983, 1984
MacRory Cup - Runner-up: 1981

Individual
All Star - Winner (1): 1984
All Star - Nominated: ?
Captain Derry Minor Ulster and All-Ireland winning side: 1983
Captain Glenullin Derry Championship winning side: 1985
Represented Ireland in three International Rules series: 1984, other years?

References

1965 births
Living people
Alumni of Ulster University
VFL/AFL players born outside Australia
Derry inter-county Gaelic footballers
Gaelic footballers who switched code
Gaelic football in Massachusetts
Glenullin Gaelic footballers
Irish expatriate sportspeople in the United States
Irish international rules football players
Irish players of Australian rules football
Prahran Football Club players
St Kilda Football Club players
Winners of one All-Ireland medal (Gaelic football)